Waubay Wetland Management District is located in the "Coteau des Prairies", or prairie hills region of South Dakota. It includes more than 300 waterfowl production areas (WPAs) in six counties of northeastern South Dakota: Clark, Codington, Day, Grant, Marshall, and Roberts. WPAs provide vital wildlife habitat in a landscape of cropland and pasture.

Access to all WPAs is limited to foot traffic only. Grass parking lots are available at many of the larger WPAs to provide off-road parking. There are no facilities or designated hiking trails. WPAs tend to be used very heavily during hunting seasons, but they also provide wonderful opportunities to explore the natural areas of South Dakota at other times of the year.

Waubay Wetland Management District includes the first waterfowl production area - McCarlson WPA, acquired in January 1959 from Arnold and Lydia McCarlson.

Gallery

References
District website

National Wildlife Refuges in South Dakota
Protected areas established in 1959
Wetlands of South Dakota
Protected areas of Clark County, South Dakota
Protected areas of Codington County, South Dakota
Protected areas of Day County, South Dakota
Protected areas of Grant County, South Dakota
Protected areas of Marshall County, South Dakota
Protected areas of Roberts County, South Dakota
1959 establishments in South Dakota